Susan R. Matthews (born July 1952) is an American science fiction writer.

Matthews was born in Fort Benning, Georgia. She lives in Seattle. She served in the US Army as operations and security officer of a Combat Support Hospital, later worked as an auditor for Boeing and graduated from Seattle University with an MBA in accounting.

Her debut novel, An Exchange of Hostages, was published by Avon Books in 1997. It was nominated for the 1997 Philip K. Dick Award and for the 1998 John W. Campbell Award for Best New Writer; it also obtained fourth place in the poll for the 1998 Locus Award for Best First Novel. Like its sequels, An Exchange of Hostages is set in a dystopic space opera future ruled by an autocratic judiciary. The novel and most of its sequels follow Andrej Koscuisko, a state torturer, and are primarily concerned with his reactions to the violence he is called on to commit. The seven-book Under Jurisdiction series concluded in 2017 with Blood Enemies.

Publications
Under Jurisdiction series
An Exchange of Hostages (1997),  (number 1 in series chronology)
Prisoner of Conscience (1998),  (number 2 in series chronology)
Hour of Judgment (1999),  (number 4 in series chronology)
Angel of Destruction (2001),  (number 3 in series chronology)
The Devil and Deep Space (2002),  (number 5 in series chronology)
Warring States (2006),  (number 6 in series chronology)
Blood Enemies (2017),  (number 7 in series chronology)
Crimes Against Humanity (2019), 

Under Jurisdiction Baen Omnibus series
Fleet Inquisitor (2016), 
An Exchange of Hostages  (number 1 in series chronology)
Prisoner of Conscience  (number 2 in series chronology)
Angel of Destruction  (number 3 in series chronology)
Fleet Renegade (2017), 
 Hour of Judgment (number 4 in series chronology)
The Devil and Deep Space (number 5 in series chronology)
Warring States (number 6 in series chronology)
Fleet Insurgent (2017),   (collection of novellas, novelettes, and short stories)

The High Pamir series (as Zarabeth Abbey)
The Wild High Places (2020), 
The Ley Lines of Kashgar (2021)

Other novels
Avalanche Soldier (1999), 
Colony Fleet (2000),

References

External links
 
 

1952 births
20th-century American novelists
20th-century American short story writers
20th-century American women writers
21st-century American novelists
21st-century American short story writers
21st-century American women writers
American science fiction writers
American women novelists
American women short story writers
Date of birth missing (living people)
Living people
Women science fiction and fantasy writers